Guilly d'Herbemont (June 25, 1888 – February 28, 1980) was the inventor of the white cane for blind people. Guilly was the daughter of a Belgian and a Frenchman. She was born in Brussels as a child, she lived alternately in Brussels and Paris. she later moved to Paris as a musician and writer. It occurred to her that blind people on the streets of Paris were increasingly endangered by the motorization of transport. The police in France used white signal sticks to regulate traffic and stop cars. Mrs d'Herbemont had the idea of putting the color white or white-painted sticks visually impaired and blind transporters in order to draw attention to themselves.

In 1930, d'Herbemont wrote a letter to the director of the national daily newspaper L'Écho de Paris.  This letter was published causing much consternation. After the letter was published, the World Blind Union recommended this innovation to be used globally to governments, and the white cane officially became the symbol of the blind. 

On February 7, 1931, d'Herbemont symbolically presented, in the presence of several ministers, the first two white canes.  These were given to a blind soldier and a blind civilian.  These were followed by the distribution of 5000 white canes to blind French veterans from World War I and blind civilians.

Works and legacy
Before she invented the white cane, Guilly d’Herbemont was active in helping the blind community. She frequently accompanied the blind through Paris crossroads (1). In one instance, while she was helping a group of blind people to cross a Parisian boulevard, a car appeared that nearly knocked everyone down (2).This was what gave her the inspiration to come up with a tool that the blind could use in traffic. Her idea wasn’t unanimously approved at first. Some of the representatives from many associations thought that this distinctive sign would be badly perceived by some individuals that were concerned not “to post” their handicap (3). As valid of a concern as it may be, even a monumental innovation such as the white stick for the blind community was met with a lot of resistance by many. In addition, Guilly d’Herbemont’s name often doesn’t come up when we think about important innovators, or even women inventors.

Evolution of the White Cane
After World War 1, there was a significant number of blind veterans in France. Motor Vehicles in Paris did not have headlights, and blind individuals in the streets did not have access to the white stick of police officers (4). Guilly recognized this problem and was instrumental in starting the movement that was responsible for making the use of white canes for civilians more widespread. Due to her efforts, drivers had an easier time stopping their vehicles for visually impaired individuals.

After Guilly’s involvement in the development of the white cane, another important innovation was the development of the “Hoover Method” (5). Towards the end of World War II, Richard Hoover, an army sergeant and a former teacher at a school for the blind in Baltimore in the United States, was assigned to a centre for the treatment of blinded soldiers in the Valley Forge Army Hospital. There he spent a week walking around blindfolded with a white cane, swinging it back and forth in front of his feet to avoid obstacles. This technique, known as the Hoover method, is now taught to visually impaired people all over the world to help them travel independently (4).

Even though there have been many technological developments that were designed to improve the white cane, Guilly’s innovation has fundamentally been unchanged.

Other Publications
1.	La Pratique du soudage oxyacétylénique et des Techniques Connexes
2.	Fleurs des Alyscamps
3.	Le désir de vivre
4.	Le jardin de ta joie
5.	Charmois
6.	Terre vaudoise
7.	Quelques poèmes

Honors received

Knight of the Legion of Honour (1947)
Officer of the Legion of Honour
Medal of the City of Paris (1976)

References

1)	Petreková, Š. (2021, April 21). Guilly d'Herbemont, mother of the White Cane. MSS Levoča. Retrieved April 18, 2022, from https://msslevoca.sk/guilly-dherbemont-mother-of-the-white-cane/?lang=en
2)	Portier-Kaltenbach, C. (2022, March 24). Guilly d'Herbemont, Inventrice de la Canne Blanche. Europe 1. Retrieved April 18, 2022, from https://www.europe1.fr/emissions/dans-lintimite-de-lhistoire/guilly-dherbemont-inventrice-de-la-canne-blanche-4095409
 
3)	Bailly, C. (1990, April). Les AUXILIAIRES des AVEUGLES. Guilly d'Herbemont - beginnings of the White Cane. Retrieved April 18, 2022, from http://dherbemont.free.fr/en/textes/cannes.html

4)	Lee, A., & Treherne, I. (2021, November 25). The unimprovable white cane. Wellcome Collection. Retrieved April 18, 2022, from https://wellcomecollection.org/articles/YY5pjBEAACYANLfm

5)	10 fascinating facts about the White Cane. Perkins School for the Blind. (2021, June 28). Retrieved April 18, 2022, from https://www.perkins.org/10-fascinating-facts-about-the-white-cane/#:~:text=Hoover%2C%20a%20World%20War%20II,t%20use%20a%20white%20cane.
6)	Herbemont, guilly d'. [WorldCat Identities]. (1970, January 1). Retrieved April 18, 2022, from http://worldcat.org/identities/lccn-n81052739/
 
7)	Guilly d'herbemont. Wikimedia Commons. (n.d.). Retrieved April 18, 2022, from https://commons.wikimedia.org/wiki/Category:Guilly_d%27Herbemont

External links
Website about Guilly d'Herbemont

1888 births
1980 deaths
20th-century French inventors
Women inventors